The following list of active People's Liberation Army aircraft is a list of military aircraft currently in service with three branches of the People's Liberation Army. For retired aircraft, see list of historic aircraft of the People's Liberation Army Air Force.

People's Liberation Army Air Force

Current inventory

People's Liberation Army Naval Air Force

People's Liberation Army Ground Force

See also 
 List of active People's Liberation Army Air Force aircraft
 List of unmanned aerial vehicles of China
 Currently active military equipment by country
 People's Liberation Army Air Force
 People's Liberation Army Naval Air Force
 People's Liberation Army Ground Force

References

Sources 

 
 

China Active People's Liberation Army Aircraft
People's Liberation Army
People's Liberation Army Air Force

Chinese military-related lists
China